Vilko Filač (14 February 1950 – 25 November 2008) was a Slovenian cinematographer. A graduate of the Film and TV School of the Academy of Performing Arts in Prague, he is best known for his work with Emir Kusturica, including When Father Was Away on Business, Underground and Time of the Gypsies.

References

External links 

1950 births
2008 deaths
Slovenian cinematographers
People from Ptuj